Apportionment is the process by which seats in a legislative body are distributed among administrative divisions, such as states or parties, entitled to representation. This page presents the general principles and issues related to apportionment. The page Apportionment by country describes specific practices used around the world. The page Mathematics of apportionment describes mathematical formulations and properties of apportionment rules.

The simplest and most universal principle is that elections should give each voter's intentions equal weight.  This is both intuitive and stated in laws such as the Fourteenth Amendment to the United States Constitution (the Equal Protection Clause).  However, there are a variety of historical and technical reasons why this principle is not followed absolutely or, in some cases, as a first priority.

Common problems
Fundamentally, the representation of a population in the thousands or millions by a reasonable size, thus accountable governing body involves arithmetic that will not be exact.  Although it could make representation more exact for a representative's votes (on proposed laws and measures etc.) to be weighted according to the number of their constituents, it avoids complexity in governance, giving equality between representatives, if each elected representative has exactly 1 vote.

Over time, populations migrate and change in number, and preferences change. Governing bodies, however, usually exist for a defined term of office.  While parliamentary systems provide for dissolution of the body in reaction to political events, no system tries to make real-time adjustments (during one term of office) to reflect demographic changes.  Instead, any redistricting takes effect at the next scheduled election or next scheduled census.

Apportionment by district
In some representative assemblies, each member represents a geographic district.  Equal representation requires that districts comprise the same number of residents or voters.  But this is not universal, for reasons including the following:

In federations like the United States and Canada, the regions, states, or provinces are important as more than mere election districts.  For example, residents of New York State identify as New Yorkers and not merely as members of some 415th Congressional district; the state also has institutional interests that it seeks to pursue in Congress through its representatives.  Consequently, election districts do not span regions.
Malapportionment might be deliberate, as when the governing documents guarantee outlying regions a specific number of seats. Denmark guarantees two seats each for Greenland and the Faroe Islands; Spain has a number of designated seats and Canada favors its territories.  Remote regions might have special views to which the governing body should give dedicated weight; otherwise they might be inclined to secede.
A lowest common denominator between adjoining voters exists, the "voting place" or "administrative quantum" (for example, a municipality, a precinct, a polling district) traditionally designed for voting convenience, tending to unite small clusters of homes and to remain little changed.  The government (or an independent body) does not organize the perfect number of voters into an election district, but a roughly appropriate number of voting places.
The basis for apportionment may be out of date.  For example, in the United States, apportionment follows the decennial census.  The states conducted the 2010 elections with districts apportioned according to the 2000 Census.  The lack of accuracy does not justify the present cost and perceived intrusion of a new census before each biennial election.

A perfectly apportioned governing body would assist but does not ensure good representation; voters who did not vote for their district's winner might have no representative who is disposed to voice their opinion in the governing body. Conversely, a representative in the governing body may voice the opinions held by a voter who is not actually their constituent, though representatives usually seek to serve their own constituents first and will only voice the interests of an outside group of voters if it pertains to their district as well or is of national importance. The representative has the power, and in many theories or jurisdictions the duty, to represent the whole cohort of people from their district.

Apportionment by party list
Nations such as Israel and the Netherlands use party-list proportional representation elections. Mexico does so for some of the members of its lower house.

In this system, voters do not vote for a person to represent their geographic district, but for a political party that aligns with the voter's philosophy.  Each party names a number of representatives based on the number of votes it receives nationally.

This system tallies (agglomerates) more of the voters' preferences.  As in other systems parties with very few voters do not earn a representative in the governing body.  Moreover, most such systems impose a threshold that a party must reach (for example, some percentage of the total vote) to qualify to obtain representatives in the body which eliminates extreme parties, to make the governing body as orderly in non-proportionate systems. With the minimum votes threshold version, if a subtype of single-issue politics based on a local issue exists, those parties or candidates distancing themselves from a broad swathe of electoral districts, such as marginal secessionists, or using a marginal minority language, may find themselves without representation.

The vast majority of voters elect representatives of their philosophies.  However, unlike district systems (or the hybrid models) no one elects a representative that represents them, or their specific region, and voters might reduce personal contact with their representatives.

Malapportionment
Malapportionment is the creation of electoral districts with divergent ratios of voters to representatives. For example, if one single-member district has 10,000 voters and another has 100,000 voters, voters in the former district have ten times the influence, per person, over the governing body. The malapportionment can be measured by seats-to-votes ratio. Malapportionment may be deliberate, for reasons such as biasing representation toward geographic areas or a minority over equality of individuals. For example, in a federation, each member unit may have the same representation regardless of its population. 

The effect might not be just a vague empowerment of some voters but a systematic bias to the nation's government. Many instances worldwide arise in which large, sparsely populated rural regions are given equal representation to densely packed urban areas. As an example, in the United States, the Republican Party benefits from institutional advantages to rural states with low populations, such that the Senate and the Presidency may reflect results counter to the total popular vote.

Unequal representation can be measured in the following ways:
By the ratio of the most populous electoral district to the least populous. In the two figures above, the ratio is 10:1.  A ratio approaching 1:1 means there are no anomalies among districts.  In India in 1991, a ratio of nearly 50:1 was measured.  The Reynolds v. Sims decision of the U.S. Supreme Court found ratios of up to 1081:1 in state legislatures.  A higher ratio measures the severity of the worst anomalies, but does not indicate whether inequality is prevalent. 
By the standard deviation of the electorates of electoral districts.
By the smallest percentage of voters that could win a majority in the governing body due to disparities in the populations of districts.  For example, in a 61-member body, this would be half the voters in the 31 districts with the lowest populations.  It is persuasive to show that far fewer than 50% of the voters could win a majority in the governing body.  But it requires additional research to conclude that such an outcome is realistic: whether the malapportionment is systematic and designed to bias the body, or is the result of random factors that give extra power to voters whose interests are unlikely to coincide.

Even when electoral districts have similar populations, legislators may draw the boundaries to pursue private agendas; see Gerrymandering.

Another form of malapportionment is called reactive malapportionment, which can come about in three ways. The first is the impact of abstentions, in which a lower turnout in a constituency means fewer votes are needed to win there. This can be seen in the UK through the Labour Party's strength in inner city areas where turnout is lowest. The second is the impact of minor parties, which works in a similar way; more votes going to smaller parties means fewer votes are needed for the two larger parties. This form of malapportionment benefits the largest party in an area where minor parties excel. Finally, the instance of a minor party winning a constituency denies victory to one of the two main parties.

Examples of malapportionment
 1955 System - In Japan, malapportionment has favoured the Liberal Democratic Party, who have ruled for over 60 years (with 2 brief periods in opposition, totaling 5 years). This has been the subject of multiple Japanese Supreme Court cases.
 Bjelkemander - a system of malapportionment Queensland, Australia during the 1970s and 1980s, designed to benefit the rural-based Country Party who were able to govern uninhibited during this period.
 Population of Canadian federal ridings - in the Canadian House of Commons, in 2021, the least populous riding had 26,000 people while the most populous had 209,000 people. Several provinces are significantly overrepresented relative to their population.
 The Constitution of Australia guarantees each of the 6 founding states an equal number of Senators, regardless of population. But this would not necessarily apply to other states, were they admitted.
 The United States Constitution guarantees each state 2 Senators regardless of population.

See also
Apportionment in the European Parliament
Apportionment in the Hellenic Parliament
United States congressional apportionment

Notes

References

External links
Index of articles relating to Boundary Delimitation from the ACE Project
A guide to the various formulae for apportionment, and statistical differences between them